William Sinclair may refer to:

Nobility
 William Sinclair, 1st Earl of Caithness (1410–1484), Scottish nobleman
 William Sinclair, 2nd Earl of Caithness (1459–1513), Scottish nobleman
 William Sinclair, 10th Earl of Caithness (1727–1779), Scottish nobleman

Politicians
 William Pirrie Sinclair (1837–1900), MP for Antrim and Falkirk Burghs
 W. E. N. Sinclair (1873–1947), Canadian barrister, solicitor and politician
 William Henry Sinclair (1864–1902), Canadian politician in the Legislative Assembly of the Northwest Territories

Religious figures
 William Sinclair (bishop) (died 1337), bishop of Dunkeld
 William Sinclair (priest) (1804–1878), Scottish author and rector of Pulborough, Sussex
 William Sinclair (archdeacon of London) (1850–1917), Anglican priest and author
 William Sinclair (United Irishmen) (died 1830), Irish revolutionary

Others
 William Sinclair (cricketer) (1846–1869), Australian cricketer
 William Sinclair (footballer) (born 1934), Scottish footballer
 William Sinclair (fur trader) (1790s–1868), chief factor of the Hudson's Bay Company
 William H. Sinclair (1838-1897) Businessman; Union Officer
 William John Sinclair (1877–1935), American geologist and paleontologist
 William Angus Sinclair (1905–1954), Scottish philosopher
 Will Sinclair, a character in Angel in My Pocket

See also
 William Saint-Clair (disambiguation), "Saint-Clair" is a variant of "Sinclair"
 Sinclair (disambiguation)
 William (disambiguation)